The 1996 Tour de la Région Wallonne was the 23rd edition of the Tour de Wallonie cycle race and was held on 3 August to 8 August 1996. The race started in Lodelinsart, Charleroi and finished in Houffalize. The race was won by Thomas Fleischer.

General classification

References

Tour de Wallonie
Tour de la Région Wallonne